The men's halfpipe competition of the FIS Freestyle World Ski Championships 2011 was held at Park City Mountain Resort, Park City, Utah, United States between February 4 and 5, 2011 (qualifications and finals).

33 athletes from 14 countries competed.

Results

Qualification
The following are the results of the qualification.

Final

References

Halfpipe, men's